Whiting Hill is a mountain in Dukes County, Massachusetts. Indian Hill and Goat Rocks are located northeast of Whiting Hill.

References

Mountains of Massachusetts
Mountains of Dukes County, Massachusetts